Moore is a popular surname in many English-speaking countries and is of Gaelic/English origin.  This surname is shared by many notable people, among them being:

A–B
A. J. Moore (born 1995), American football player
A. L. Moore (Arthur Louis Moore; 1849–1939), English stained glass designer and manufacturer
A. W. Moore (philosopher) (Adrian W. Moore, born 1956), English professor of philosophy at the University of Oxford
Abra Moore (born 1969), Irish-American singer-songwriter
Adam Moore (born 1984), American baseball player
Addison Webster Moore (1866–1930), American professor of philosophy at the University of Chicago
Al Moore (disambiguation), multiple people
Alan Moore (born 1953), English comic book writer and novelist
Albert Joseph Moore (1841–1893), English decorative painter
Albert Moore (Medal of Honor) (1862–1916), United States Marine
Albert Moore (footballer, born 1863) (1863–?), English footballer for Notts County
Albert Moore (footballer, born 1898) (1898–?), English footballer for Stoke
 Alecia Beth Moore, better known as Pink (born 1979), American pop/rock/R&B singer
Alfred Moore (1755–1810), associate justice of the US Supreme Court
Alvin Moore (disambiguation), multiple people
Ann Moore (equestrian) (born 1950), 1972 Olympic silver medalist in show jumping
Ann Moore (impostor) (1761–1813), notorious as the fasting-woman of Tutbury
Ann Moore (inventor) (born 1940), inventor of the Snugli
Ann S. Moore (born 1950), CEO of Time Inc.
Anne Elizabeth Moore, editor, artist, and author
 Annie May Moore: see May and Mina Moore (1882–1957), Australian photographers
Anthony Moore (born 1948), British musician and composer
Aoife Moore (fl. 2020's), Northern Irish journalist
Arch A. Moore Jr. (1923–2015), twice Governor of West Virginia
Archie Moore (1916–1998), American world boxing champion
Arnold Moore (1914–2004), American blues singer
Arthur A. C. Moore (1880–1935), Canadian ice hockey player
Arthur Cotton Moore (born 1935), American architect
Arthur William Moore (1853–1909), Manx historian, antiquarian, linguist, folklorist and politician
Aubertine Woodward Moore (1841–1929; pseudonym, "Auber Forestier"), American musician, writer
Barbara Moore (athlete) (born 1957), New Zealand long-distance runner
Barbara Moore (vegetarian) (1903-1977), Russian-born long distance walker
Ben Moore (basketball) (born 1995), American basketball player in the Israeli Basketball Premier League
Benjamin E. Moore, New York assemblyman 1914
Benjamin Moore (bishop) (1748–1816), American Protestant Episcopal bishop
Bill Moore (disambiguation), multiple people
Billie Moore (1943–2022), American basketball coach
Bob Moore (disambiguation), multiple people
Bobby Moore (1941–1993), English footballer
Brian Moore (disambiguation), multiple people
Briley Moore (born 1998), American football player
Bucky Moore (1905–1980), American football player
Butch Moore (James Augustine Moore, 1938–2001), Irish showband icon during the 1960s
Byron Moore (born 1988), English (soccer) football player

C–D
C. Ellis Moore (1884–1941), U.S. Representative from Ohio
C. J. Moore (born 1995), American football player
C. L. Moore, Catherine L. Moore (1911–1987), American science fiction and fantasy writer
Carissa Moore, American professional surfer
Carrie Moore (basketball) (born 1985), American basketball player and coach
Chandler Moore (born 1995), American Christian singer, songwriter, and worship leader
Chanté Moore (born 1967), American singer
Charles Moore (disambiguation), multiple people
Charlie Moore (disambiguation), multiple people
Charlotte Moore (disambiguation), multiple people
Christine Moore (disambiguation), multiple people
Christopher Moore (author) (born 1957), American absurdist writer
Christy Moore (born 1945), Irish folk singer, songwriter, and guitarist
Chuck Moore (American football) (born 1940), former American football offensive lineman
Claire Moore (disambiguation), multiple people
Clara Jessup Moore (1824–1899), American philanthropist and writer
Clarence Bloomfield Moore (1852–1936), American archaeologist
Clarence Lemuel Elisha Moore (1876–1931), American mathematician
Clayton Moore (1914–1999), American actor
Clement Clarke Moore (1779–1863), American professor and writer
Clifford Herschel Moore (1866–1931), American Latin scholar
Clover Moore (born 1945), Australian politician and Lord Mayor of Sydney, Australia
Constance Moore (1920–2005), American singer and actress
Corey Moore (safety) (born 1993), American football player
Cowboy Jimmy Moore (born James William Moore, 1910–1999), pool champion
Craig Moore (born 1975), Australian soccer player
Cristopher Moore (born 1968), American computer scientist, mathematician, and physicist
D. C. Moore (born 1980), British playwright
D. J. Moore (cornerback) (born 1987), American football player
D. J. Moore (wide receiver) (born 1997), American football player
Damontre Moore (born 1992), American football player
Daniel Moore (disambiguation), multiple people
Darius A. Moore (1833–1905), New York politician
Darren Moore (born 1974), English football player and coach
Davey Moore (boxer, born 1933) (1933–1963), American world champion boxer
Davey Moore (boxer, born 1959) (1959–1988), American world champion boxer
David Moore (disambiguation), multiple people
Deacon John Moore (born 1941), American musician, singer, and bandleader
Demi Moore (born 1962), American actress
Dennis Moore (politician) (born 1945), American politician from Kansas
Derland Moore (1953-2010), American football player
Devin Moore (murderer), American murderer
Dickie Moore (actor) (1925–2015), American actor
Dickie Moore (ice hockey) (1931–2015), Canadian ice hockey player
Dominic Moore (born 1980), Canadian ice hockey player (NHL)
Donnie Moore (1954–1989), American baseball player
 Doris Langley Moore (1902–1989), British female fashion historian
Dorothea Rhodes Lummis Moore (1857–1942), American physician, writer, newspaper editor, activist
Douglas Moore (1893–1969), American composer, and president, National Institute and American Academy of Arts & Letters
Dudley Moore (1935–2002), English actor and comedian
Dylan Moore (born 1992), American baseball player

E–I
E. Blackburn Moore (1897–1980) Speaker of the Virginia House of Delegates
E. H. Moore (1862–1932), American mathematician
Edward Moore (disambiguation), multiple people
Edwin Ward Moore (1810–1865), American-born Texan commander of the Texas Navy
Eleanor May Moore (1875–1949), Australian pacifist
Elijah Moore (born 2000), American football player
Elizabeth Moore (historian), (1894 – 1976), American local historian and preservationist
Ellen Bryan Moore (1912–1999), Louisiana politician
Ennio Girolami (1935–2013), sometimes credited as Thomas Moore, Italian actor
Enoch Moore (loyalist turned rebel) (1779–1841), American Revolution
Erica Moore (born 1988), American middle-distance runner
Esther Moore (1857–1934), English artist
Eva Moore (1870–1955), English actress
Francis Daniels Moore (1913–2001), American surgeon
Frank Moore (disambiguation), multiple people
Fred Moore (animator) (1911-1952), animator
Freddy Moore (born 1950), American musician
Frederic Moore (1830–1907), British Indian Lepidopterist
G. E. Moore (1873–1958), British philosopher
Gareth Moore (born 1989), British rugby player
Garry Moore (mayor) (born 1951), former mayor of Christchurch, New Zealand
Garry Moore (1915–1993), American television host
Gary Moore (1952–2011), Northern Irish guitarist
George Moore (disambiguation), multiple people
Gerald Moore (1899–1987), English classical pianist
Gillian Moore, retired Australian school principal
Gordon Moore (born 1929), American co-founder of Intel Corporation and the author of Moore's law
Gordon Moore (Royal Navy officer) (1862–1934)
Grace Moore (1898–1947), American soprano and actress
 Vice-Admiral Sir Graham Moore (Royal Navy officer) (1764–1843), career officer
Greg Moore (racing driver) (1975–1999), Canadian racing driver
Gwen Moore (born 1951), US Congresswomen from Wisconsin
Gwen Moore (California politician), (1940-2020), California state legislator
H. Byron Moore (1839–1925), Australian horse racing official
Hal Moore (born 1922), American Lieutenant General in the U.S. Army
Harry Moore (disambiguation), multiple people
Harvey T. Moore (1809–1878), American politician
Hayden Moore (born 1995), American football player
Helen Moore (academic) (born 1970), British literary scholar 
Henry Moore (1898–1986), English artist and sculptor
Henry Moore (disambiguation), multiple people
Henson Moore (William Henson Moore III, born 1939), American lawyer and politician, U.S. Representative from Louisiana
Irving J. Moore (1919–1993), American television director

J–M
J. Howard Moore (1862–1916), American zoologist, philosopher, educator and socialist
J Strother Moore, American computer scientist
J. Washington Moore (1866–1965), American politician
Jackie Moore (singer) (born 1946), American jazz singer from Florida
Jade Moore (born 1990), English association footballer
Jacqueline Moore (born 1964), American professional wrestler
Jacqueline S. Moore (1926–2002), American. poet
Jalen Moore (disambiguation), multiple people
James Moore (disambiguation), multiple people
Jason Moore (disambiguation), multiple people
Jaylon Moore (disambiguation), multiple people
Jerrie Moore (1855–1890), Canadian baseball player
Jerry A. Moore Jr. (1918–2017), American politician
Jessica Moore (journalist) (born 1982), American journalist
J'Mon Moore (born 1995), American football player
Joe Moore (television journalist), American news anchor in Hawaii
Joel David Moore (born 1977), American actor
John Moore (disambiguation), multiple people
Jonas Moore (1617–1679), English mathematician
Juanita Moore (1914–2014), American actress
Julianne Moore (born 1960), American actress
Justin P. Moore (1841–1923), American mycologist
Kamrin Moore (born 1996), American football player
Karl Moore (academic), Canadian professor of business management
Karl Moore (footballer) (born 1988), Irish footballer
Kathy Wolfe Moore (born 1957), American politician
Kayla Moore, American president of Foundation of Moral Law
Kellen Moore (born 1988), American football player and coach
Kenny Moore (American football) (born 1995), American football player
Kenny Moore (1943–2022), American athlete
Kenya Moore (born 1971), American actress, television personality and former Miss USA 1993 
Kevin Moore (born 1967), American musician
Kip Moore (born 1980), American country music singer-songwriter
Lecrae, (born Lecrae Moore, 1979), American Christian hip hop artist and music executive
Leo M. Moore, American politician
Lena L. Moore, American politician
Lilian Moore (1909–2004), American author of children's books, teacher and poet
Lisa Moore (disambiguation), multiple people
Lucy Moore (historian) (born 1970), historian
Luke Moore (born 1986), English footballer
Madge Moore (1922-2016), American aviator
Mandy Moore (disambiguation), multiple people, including:
Mandy Moore (born 1984), American pop-singer and actress
Mandy Moore (choreographer) (born 1976), American dancer and choreographer
Manfred Moore (1950–2020), American football player
Margaret Moore, Canadian author of romance novels
Marguerite Moore (1849–?), Irish-Catholic orator, patriot, activist
Marianne Moore (1887–1972), American poet
Marie Moore (born 1967), former international butterfly swimmer from Canada
Marshall Moore (born 1970), American author
Marshall W. Moore (1929-2022), American politician and civil engineer
 Martha Moore, birthname of Martha Ballard, American midwife and healer
Mary Tyler Moore (1936–2017), American actress and comedian
Matt Moore (actor) (1888–1960), Irish-born American silent film actor
Matt Moore (baseball) (born 1989), American baseball player
Maurice Moore (disambiguation), multiple people
 May Moore or Mina Moore: see May and Mina Moore, Australian photographers
Maya Moore (born 1989), American basketball player
McKenzie Moore (born 1992), American player in the Israeli Basketball Premier League
Melissa Moore (actress) (born 1963), American movie actress and equestrian
Melissa Moore (athlete) (born 1968), Australian Olympic sprinter
Mica Moore (born 1992), British bobsledder and sprinter
Michael Moore (born 1954), American social critic and documentary film director
Michael Moore (disambiguation), multiple people (Michael, Mike)
Michel Moore, LAPD Chief
Milcah Martha Moore (1740–1829), American poet
 Minnie Louise Moore: see May and Mina Moore (1882–1957), Australian photographers
Mona Moore (1917–2000), English artist

N–S
Nathaniel Moore (disambiguation), multiple people (Nat, Nathan, Nathaniel)
Newton Moore (1870–1936), Australian politician
Nicholas Moore (disambiguation), multiple people
Owen Moore (1886–1939), Irish-born American silent film actor
Patrick Moore (1923–2012), English astronomer
Patrick Moore (disambiguation), multiple people
Paul Moore (disambiguation), multiple people
Pauline Moore (1914–2002), American actress
Peter Moore (disambiguation), multiple people
Pippa Moore, English ballet dancer
Powell A. Moore (1928–2018), American politician and public servant
Rahim Moore (born 1990), American football player
Ramona Moore (19782012), American homicide victim
Randle T. Moore (1874–1957), American businessman
Ransom Asa Moore, an agronomist and professor at the University of Wisconsin-Madison
Ransom B. Moore, California pioneer and Arizona Territory legislator
Rebecca Moore (pageant titleholder) (born 1988), American beauty pageant winner
Richard Moore (disambiguation), multiple people (includes Richard, Rich, Dick, Dickie)
Ricky Moore (disambiguation), multiple people
Robert Moore (disambiguation), multiple people
Robin Moore (1925–2008), American writer
Rodrick Moore Jr., better known as Roddy Ricch, American rapper, singer, and songwriter
Roger Moore (1927–2017), English actor best known for James Bond
Roger Moore (computer scientist) (born 1939), American computer scientist
Romona Moore (19812003), American murder victim
Ronald Moore (disambiguation), multiple people
Rondale Moore (born 2000), American football player
Roy Moore (born 1947), former Chief Justice of Alabama
Rudy Ray Moore (1927–2008), African-American singer, comedian and cult-film maker
Saiphin Moore, Thai chef and business owner
Samuel Moore (disambiguation), multiple people
Sara Jane Moore (born 1930), American failed assassin
Scotty Moore (1931–2016), American blues and rock guitarist
Shannon Moore (born 1979), American professional wrestler
Shemar Moore (born 1970), American actor
Skai Moore (born 1995), American football player
 Sonny Moore, better known as Skrillex, American songwriter and electronic music producer
Spence Moore II (born 1997), American actor
Stanton Moore (born 1972), American drummer
Stephen Moore (disambiguation), multiple people
Sterling Moore (born 1990), American football player
Steve Moore (disambiguation), multiple people
Steven Moore (disambiguation), multiple people
Susanna Moore (born 1945), American crime writer
Susanne Vandegrift Moore (1848–1926), American editor, publisher

T–Z
Tanya Moore (died 1986), American murder victim
Tarvarius Moore (born 1996), American football player
Taylor Moore (born 1997), English footballer
Thomas Moore (disambiguation), multiple people (Thomas, Tom, Tommy)
Thurston Moore (born 1958), American guitarist and experimental musician
Tracey Moore (born 1960), Canadian voice actress
Trevor Moore (disambiguation), multiple people
Tyria Moore (born 1965), involved with American serial killer Aileen Wuornos
Vinnie Moore (born 1964), American musician
Walthall M. Moore (1886–1960), American politician, black state representative in Missouri
Warren "Pete" Moore (born 1939), singer
Wendell Moore (disambiguation), multiple people
Wes Moore (born 1978), 63rd and incumbent Governor of Maryland
Whistlin' Alex Moore (1899–1989), American blues pianist, singer and whistler 
Wilcy Moore (1897–1963), American baseball player
Wild Bill Moore (1918–1983), tenor saxophone player
Will Moore (gridiron football) (born 1970), American football wide receiver
William Moore (disambiguation), multiple people
Willie Moore (Cork hurler) (1931–2003), Irish hurler for Cork
Willie Moore (Limerick hurler) (born 1950), Irish hurler for Limerick
Zephaniah Swift Moore (1770–1823), American clergyman and educator

Other people
Moore Brothers (disambiguation)

Fictional characters 
 Charlie Moore, lead character of the television series Head of the Class
 Nick Moore, a character in the American sitcom television series Family Ties
 Olivia Moore, fictional character in the TV series iZombie
 Poppy Moore, the main character in the 2008 British American teen comedy film movie Wild Child
Rachel Moore, fictional character in the anime and manga Case Closed
Richard Moore, fictional character from the detective manga and anime series Case Closed
 Samantha Moore, a character in the 1989 action movie No Holds Barred

Lists of people by surname